Rogier Veenstra (born 17 September 1987) is a Dutch former professional footballer who played as a forward or left winger. He manages ASWH.

Career

Player 
Born in Middelburg, Veenstra began his career at amateur side DVV Duiven. He later joined RCS Middelburg where he was scouted by top flight club NAC Breda. Veenstra played there five years in the youth.

He made his debut in professional football, being part of the NAC Breda squad in the 2006–07 season. Veenstra was loaned out to SBV Excelsior for the 2008–09 season, and in January 2009 he went  to HFC Haarlem on loan from NAC Breda.

In June 2010, Veenstra returned to amateur football and joined Topklasse side, HSV Hoek. In May 2011, it was announced he would join VV Kloetinge. He played for Kloetinge until 2013.

Manager 
In 2015, Veenstra became the assistant manager of Zeelandia's first squad. The next season he managed Zeelandia. Thereafter, he coached VV Goes for two seasons.

In 2019, he signed as manager of Tweede Divisie-side ASWH. Before he started coaching, the club had made it against all odds into the Tweede Divisie. His first season at ASWH was challenging as the club did not have the funds for semiprofessional football. When the season ended early because of coronavirus, ASWH was dead-last yet stayed in the Tweede because all relegations had been canceled.

References

External links
 Profile at Voetbal International

1987 births
Living people
People from Middelburg, Zeeland
Association football forwards
Association football wingers
Dutch footballers
Eredivisie players
Eerste Divisie players
NAC Breda players
Excelsior Rotterdam players
HFC Haarlem players
HSV Hoek players
ASWH managers
Dutch football managers
Footballers from Zeeland